Hillary Clinton has unsuccessfully run for president twice:

* Hillary Clinton 2008 presidential campaign
 Hillary Clinton 2016 presidential campaign

See also
 Hillary Clinton 2008 presidential primary campaign